Forbes Point is a point forming the east side of the entrance to Lester Cove, Andvord Bay, on the west coast of Graham Land, Antarctica. The name "Forbes Hill" was given by Scottish geologist David Ferguson in 1913–14 to a corner or spur of the plateau escarpment which is not a definable feature. From it, however, a ridge runs down to a prominent point useful for reference purposes, to which the name Forbes has been applied.

References 

Headlands of Graham Land
Danco Coast